The Libertarian Party of North Carolina (LPNC) is the North Carolina affiliate of the Libertarian Party.

History

The Liberatarian Party of North Carolina was founded in 1976, and has fielded candidates for president and governor in every election since then (except 1988). In order to do so, they have performed eight petition drives so that they can gain recognition from the state, allowing to maintain consistent ballot status from 1996 to 2004 and field 300 candidates for a variety of offices. 

In 1976, Arlan Andrews, one of the party’s founders, was the first Libertarian candidate for governor.

“I gave newspaper and TV interviews across the state, debated the American Party candidate, Chub Seawell, on TV and generally had a great time,” recalled Andrews.

“I got some time with [Libertarian presidential candidate] Roger MacBride in his DC-3, confronted Democratic candidate Jim Hunt in a TV studio and embarrassed him in front of his laughing staff, and was threatened with death by the Worker’s Party Larouchians.”

In 1978, Libertarians contested three of the 11 U.S. House seats in North Carolina. In 1992, Libertarian candidate for governor Scott McLaughlin received 4.5 percent of the popular vote and 104,983 votes. This remains the highest percentage gained by and third-party candidate for that office. That same year, three Libertarian candidates for the General Assembly each received more than 12 percent of the votes in their races.

There were Libertarian candidates for U.S. Senate and all 12 U.S. House seats in 1998.

In 2002, Libertarians fielded 145 candidates, including candidates for a majority of the seats in both houses of the General Assembly. Two years later, the party had candidates for governor, lieutenant governor, U.S. Senate, 12 state Senate, and 24 state House seats.

Dropped from the ballot in 2005, the party conducted what became its last petition drive for ballot status.

In 2008, Dr. Michael Munger, a Duke University, political science professor, qualified the LPNC as the first “new party” in modern North Carolina to retain ballot status through the ballot box. Munger got 2.87 percent of the vote for governor. 

In 2012, Barbara Howe, running her third campaign for governor, received 2.13 percent of the vote.

In the 2014 U.S. Senate, Sean Haugh, a former state chair and veteran Libertarian candidate, received what was at the time the highest number of votes for any statewide Libertarian candidate since 2008.  

In 2018, the first Libertarian candidate for judge set a new record. Michael Monaco got 167,772 votes for the State Court of Appeals. Then in 2020, U.S. Senate candidate Shannon Bray beat that record, reaching 171,571 votes.

In addition to petitioning for ballot access, the LPNC has championed ballot access reform through legislation, working groups across the political spectrum. These groups included the Green and Constitution parties, the John Locke Foundation, Democracy NC, Common Cause, and the ACLU. Several bills the party and others sponsored chipped away at the restrictive barriers.

In 2005, the party filed an unsuccessful lawsuit, later joined by the Green Party, challenging North Carolina’s “entire statutory scheme of regulating political parties” under the state constitution. Oddly, in 2006 while the lawsuit was still going through the courts, the General Assembly lowered the retention threshold from 10 percent to 2 percent. Perseverance and persistence working for free, fair, and open elections eventually paid off in 2017 – a bill passed by the General Assembly dramatically lowered ballot access barriers.

The key reforms were to reduce the number of signatures needed to be recognized as a political party from two percent to one-quarter of one percent of the voter for governor in the last election. The second significant change is to allow a party that had a presidential candidate on the ballot in at least 35 states to also qualify for the North Carolina ballot.

As a result of these changes, North Carolina will no longer be a two-party state, and the LPNC is all but assured of permanent ballot status.

The party has maintained a website (LPNC.org) since 1996 and has held annual conventions across the state since its inception. Executive committee members are elected biannually at these conventions to carry out the essential functions of a political party.

Organization
Members of the executive committee are elected biannually at conventions to carry out the essential functions of a political party.
 State Chair: Ryan Brown 
 Vice Chair: Sean Haugh 
 Treasurer: Mike Ross 
 Secretary: Dee Watson
 Members at Large:
 Mac Browder
 Nick Taylor
 Christina Aragues
 Angela Humphries

The party also maintains active local organizations in over two dozen counties and on half a dozen college campuses. LPNC may also be the only party in U.S. history that had an Indian Nation as an active local affiliate, the Eastern Band of Cherokee Indians.

Party platform
The most recent platform of the Libertarian Party of North Carolina was adopted at the party's convention on March 6, 2022.

The Libertarian Party of North Carolina follows the national party's platform with certain planks tailored to state-specific issues such as advocating for the abolition of the North Carolina ABC and the North Carolina Education Lottery along with a liberalization of laws to allow private actors to compete in these spaces. The party supports efforts to greatly expand ballot access in the state for both organized parties and individual independents and has partnered with the Green Party of North Carolina to sue both the Federal Election Commission and the State of North Carolina in efforts to improve access to debates and elections.

Recent election results

2020 elections

Gubernatorial election

United States Senate election

Electoral history
In 1992, Libertarian candidate for Governor Scott Earle McLaughlin achieved 4.1 percent of the popular vote in a fully contested race, with 104,983 votes. This remains the highest percentage gained by a third party candidate for that office by any party in North Carolina since that year.

In the 2008 elections, Michael Munger running as the party's candidate for Governor of North Carolina, received 121,585 votes for 2.9% of the total vote.

Also in 2008, Chris Cole, running as the party's candidate for US Senate, received 133,430 votes for 3.1% of the total vote.

Related
 List of State Libertarian Parties
 North Carolina Green Party

References

External links
 

North Carolina
Political parties in North Carolina
1975 establishments in North Carolina